Thancule Dezart (born 15 April 1947) is a Haitian long-distance runner. He competed in the marathon at the 1976 Summer Olympics.

References

1947 births
Living people
Athletes (track and field) at the 1976 Summer Olympics
Haitian male long-distance runners
Haitian male marathon runners
Olympic athletes of Haiti
Place of birth missing (living people)